
Gmina Czaplinek is an urban-rural gmina (administrative district) in Drawsko County, West Pomeranian Voivodeship, in north-western Poland.

The gmina contains part of the protected area called Drawsko Landscape Park.

Villages
Apart from the town of Czaplinek, Gmina Czaplinek contains the villages and settlements of Bielice, Broczyno, Brzezinka, Buszcze, Byszkowo, Chmielewo, Cichorzecze, Czarne Małe, Czarne Wielkie, Dobrzyca Mała, Drahimek, Głęboczek, Kamienna Góra, Karsno, Kluczewo, Kluczewo-Kolonia, Kołomąt, Kosin, Kuszewo, Kuźnica Drawska, Łąka, Łazice, Łysinin, Machliny, Miłkowo, Motarzewo, Niwka, Nowa Wieś, Nowe Drawsko, Ostroróg, Piaseczno, Piekary, Podstrzesze, Prosinko, Prosino, Psie Głowy, Rzepowo, Sikory, Stare Drawsko, Stare Gonne, Stare Kaleńsko, Studniczka, Sulibórz, Trzciniec, Turze, Wełnica, Wrześnica, Zdziersko, Żelisławie and Żerdno.

Neighbouring gminas
Gmina Czaplinek is bordered by the gminas of Barwice, Borne Sulinowo, Jastrowie, Ostrowice, Połczyn-Zdrój, Wałcz, Wierzchowo and Złocieniec.

References
Polish official population figures 2006

Czaplinek
Drawsko County